Lautaro Gordillo (born 6 April 1999) is an Argentine professional footballer who plays as a forward for Ferro Carril Oeste.

Career
Gordillo began his career with Ferro Carril Oeste. He was selected for his professional debut on 6 April 2018 against Deportivo Riestra, with the forward being substituted on for Lautaro Torres on eighty-two minutes. After six total appearances off the bench for the club, Gordillo left on loan in January 2020 to Flandria of Primera B Metropolitana. He appeared for his debut on 2 February against Argentino, before making the first start of his career five days later versus Defensores Unidos. Gordillo returned to Ferro on 1 July, though would rejoin Flandria on 23 September; having extended his contract with his parent club.

Career statistics
.

References

External links

1999 births
Living people
Place of birth missing (living people)
Argentine footballers
Association football forwards
Primera Nacional players
Primera B Metropolitana players
Ferro Carril Oeste footballers
Flandria footballers